Urzhar Airport is classified as a national aerodrome in the latest AIP.

Airlines and destinations
As of December 2021, there are no scheduled services at the airfield.

References

Airports built in the Soviet Union
Airports in Kazakhstan